Michael Hart Cardozo IV (September 15, 1910 – October 20, 1996) was an American lawyer and professor who held government positions over more than a sixty-year career.

Cardozo was born in Manhattan, New York on September 15, 1910, and was raised in a Jewish household.

Cardozo died of chronic lung disease on October 20, 1996, aged 86, at his home in Washington. He was survived by his wife, three children, and five grandchildren.

References

20th-century American lawyers
1910 births
1996 deaths
Deaths from lung disease
People from Manhattan
Jewish American government officials
Academics from Washington (state)
20th-century American Jews